Wavrechain-sous-Denain (literally Wavrechain under Denain) is a commune in the Nord department in northern France.

Population

See also
Communes of the Nord department

References

Wavrechainsousdenain